Kevin Maek (born 4 November 1988) is a German former professional footballer who played as a centre-back. He is the son of Mario Maek.

External links

1988 births
Living people
Association football midfielders
Association football defenders
German footballers
VfL Wolfsburg II players
1. FC Union Berlin players
SV Werder Bremen II players
Alemannia Aachen players
1. FC Saarbrücken players
SV Elversberg players
FC 08 Homburg players
3. Liga players
Regionalliga players
Footballers from Berlin